The 2021–22 season is the 123rd season in the existence of K Beerschot VA and the club's second consecutive season in the top flight of Belgian football. In addition to the domestic league, K Beerschot VA will participate in this season's edition of the Belgian Cup.

Players

First-team squad

Out on loan

Transfers

Pre-season and friendlies

Competitions

Overall record

First Division A

League table

Results summary

Results by round

Matches
The league fixtures were announced on 8 June 2021.

Belgian Cup

References

K Beerschot VA
Beerschot